Kristine Peterson (born May 8, 1958) is a film director who worked as an assistant director and second unit director on several films as well as directing her own films in the late '80s and '90s. She was a member of the staff at Zoetrope Studios for the filming of Apocalypse Now.

Filmography as Director
 1988 Deadly Dreams
 1990 Body Chemistry
 1991 Lower Level
 1991 Critters 3
 1994 The Hard Truth
 1995 Redemption: Kickboxer 5
 1997 Slaves to the Underground

Filmography as Second Unit Director or Assistant Director
 1984 The Oasis
 1984 Exterminator 2
 1984 Gimme an 'F'
 1985 Grunt! The Wrestling Movie
 1986 Chopping Mall
 1986 The Ladies Club
 1986 The Supernaturals
 1986 Reform School Girls
 1987 Nightflyers
 1988 The Drifter
 1988 Beach Balls
 1989 Bill & Ted's Excellent Adventure
 1989 Beverly Hills Bodysnatchers
 1989 A Nightmare on Elm Street 5: The Dream Child
 1990 Tremors

References

External links
 

American film directors
American women film directors
American women television directors
American television directors
Living people
1958 births
21st-century American women